A.A. Parsons Farmstead, also known as the Parsons / Vapor Farmstead, is a historic farm and national historic district located at Washington Township, Hendricks County, Indiana.  The district encompasses eight contributing buildings, four contributing structures, and seven contributing objects on a farmstead developed between about 1880 and 1920. The farm includes a one-of-a-kind combination building with a hog barn, chicken house, and corn cribs.  The farmhouse was built about 1875 and is a -story, "L"-shaped frame dwelling.

It was added to the National Register of Historic Places in 2014.

References

Farms on the National Register of Historic Places in Indiana
Historic districts on the National Register of Historic Places in Indiana
Houses completed in 1875
National Register of Historic Places in Hendricks County, Indiana
Historic districts in Hendricks County, Indiana